The Refugee Tract is an area of land in Ohio, United States granted to people from British Canada who left home prior to July 4, 1776, stayed in the US until November 25, 1783 continuously, and aided the revolutionary cause.

Location

It extends for  eastward from the Scioto River along the south line of the United States Military District.

History
During the American Revolutionary War, there were certain men of Canada and Nova Scotia, who sympathized with, and rendered aid to the United States, some of them joining the American Army. For this lack of loyalty to the Crown of Great Britain, that government confiscated their possessions. For their co-operation with the colonists, in their struggle for independence, the government of the United States caused this strip of land to be granted them.

In 1783 and 1785, the Congress promised to compensate the Canadians with land as soon as it was possible to do so. The Land Ordinance of 1785 reserved “three townships adjacent to Lake Erie” for their use. This land belonged to Connecticut, and so was not theirs to promise. In 1798, Congress published advertisements in newspapers inviting those with claims to file an account within two years. The Secretaries of Treasury and War examined the testimonies to determine the quantity of land each should receive. The claimants land was selected by drawing lots. An act of April 29, 1816 authorized the Chillicothe Land Office to sell the unclaimed  as Congress Lands. Several men who missed the deadline for claiming land were compensated with land in other parts of the country in the 1820s and 1830s.

In Columbus the Refugee Grant lies approximately between Fifth Avenue on the north and Refugee Road on the south. The Ohio Statehouse and most downtown office buildings are located within the tract.

Legacy
Refugee Road in Columbus is named after the Tract. This road continues into Fairfield County and runs along the southern border of the tract.
In Licking County, a different parallel road also named Refugee Road runs along the northern border of the tract.

A plaque affixed to the LeVeque Tower memorializes the Tract.

Truro Township, settled by the Canadian Taylor family, was named after Truro, Nova Scotia.

See also
Ohio Lands
Historic regions of the United States

Notes

References

External links
1883 History of Fairfield County
Ohio History Central - Refugee Tract

Franklin County, Ohio
Licking County, Ohio
Perry County, Ohio
Fairfield County, Ohio
Canadian-American culture in Ohio
Former regions and territories of the United States
Geography of Ohio
Pre-statehood history of Ohio
History of the Midwestern United States
1801 in the United States
Political divisions of the United States